Megan Leitch is a Canadian actress probably best known for playing Samantha Mulder on The X-Files.

Filmography

Film

Television

External links

References 

1965 births
Living people
Actresses from Vancouver
Canadian film actresses
Canadian television actresses
Canadian voice actresses
20th-century Canadian actresses
21st-century Canadian actresses